Michael Inzlicht is professor of psychology at the University of Toronto recognized in the areas of social psychology and neuroscience. Although he has published papers on the topics of prejudice, academic performance, and religion, his most recent interests have been in the topics of self-control, where he borrows methods from affective and cognitive neuroscience to understand the underlying nature of self-control, including how it is driven by motivation.

In the early 2000s, he and his colleagues claimed to demonstrate that small, seemingly benign characteristics of an environment could play a large role in determining how stereotyped groups perform on academic tests. They found, for example, that the number of men in a small group could determine whether women succeeded (fewer men) or failed (more men) a math test. Although this work on stereotype threat was well received, Professor Inzlicht has of late suggested that work on stereotype threat might not be replicable.

In his more recent work,  Professor Inzlicht has primarily focused on improving our understanding of self-control and the related concepts of cognitive control and executive function (mental processes that allow behavior to vary adaptively depending on current goals). Much of his work explores the building blocks of control, including its neural, cognitive, emotional, and motivational foundations. At the same time—and at a different level of analysis—he also explores the various ways that self-control can be influenced by various cultural and situational factors, including mindfulness meditation, quality of motivation, religious belief, and stigmatization. Another feature of his work is that he takes a social affective neuroscience approach to address questions of interest. Thus, he combines neuroimaging, cognitive reaction time, physiological, and behavioral techniques to understand and explain social behaviour. This interdisciplinary approach provides a fuller, more integrated understanding of social behavior, emotion, and the brain.

In recent years, Professor Inzlicht's has become a vocal and often passionate advocate for open science reform. Part of his advocacy included not only criticizing the status quo and lamenting the clear evidence that psychology was suffering from a replication crisis; but also examining his own past scientific work, asking how much his own work might be simply false.

Selected Awards & Honours
 2016-2019 - Research Excellence Faculty Scholar, University of Toronto Scarborough
 2017 - NeuroLeadership Application of Science Award
 2015 - Wegner Theoretical Innovation Prize, Society for Personality and Social Psychology
 2015 - Principal's Research Award, University of Toronto Scarborough
 2013 - Best Social Cognition Paper Award, International Society for Social Cognition
 2013 - Fellow of the Association for Psychological Science
 2009 - Early Researcher Award, Ontario Ministry of Research and Innovation
 2006 - Louise Kidder Early Career Award, American Psychological Association (Division 9)
 2004-2006 - Fellow of the National Academy of Education/Spencer Foundation
 2002 - Society for Experimental Social Psychology, Dissertation Award, finalist

See also
 Replication crisis

Selected publications

 
 
 
 
 
 Inzlicht, M., Legault, L., & *Teper, R. (2014). Exploring the mechanisms of self-control improvement. Current Directions in Psychological Science, 23, 302-307. doi: 10.1177/0963721414534256
 
 
 *Tritt, S M., Page-Gould, E., Peterson, J. B., & Inzlicht, M. (2014). System justification and electrophysiological responses to feedback: Support for a positivity bias. Journal of Experimental Psychology: General, 143, 1004-1010. doi:10.1037/a0035179
 
 
 
 
 
 Inzlicht, M. & Schmader, T. (2011). Stereotype Threat: Theory, Process, and Application. New York: Oxford University Press.

References

External links
 Michael Inzlicht's Academic Website at the University of Toronto

Social psychologists
Academic staff of the University of Toronto
Living people
1972 births
McGill University Faculty of Medicine alumni
Brown University alumni